Aalen – Heidenheim is an electoral constituency (German: Wahlkreis) represented in the Bundestag. It elects one member via first-past-the-post voting. Under the current constituency numbering system, it is designated as constituency 270. It is located in eastern Baden-Württemberg, comprising the Heidenheim district and the eastern part of the Ostalbkreis district.

Aalen – Heidenheim was created for the 1965 federal election. Since 2009, it has been represented by Roderich Kiesewetter of the Christian Democratic Union (CDU).

Geography
Aalen – Heidenheim is located in eastern Baden-Württemberg. As of the 2021 federal election, it comprises the Heidenheim district and the municipalities of Aalen, Adelmannsfelden, Bopfingen, Ellenberg, Ellwangen, Essingen, Hüttlingen, Jagstzell, Kirchheim am Ries, Lauchheim, Neresheim, Neuler, Oberkochen, Rainau, Riesbürg, Rosenberg, Stödtlen, Tannhausen, Unterschneidheim, Westhausen, and Wört from the Ostalbkreis district.

History
Aalen – Heidenheim was created in 1965. In the 1965 through 1998 elections, it was constituency 174 in the numbering system. In the 2002 and 2005 elections, it was number 271. Since the 2009 election, it has been number 270.

Originally, the constituency comprised the districts of Aalen and Heidenheim. It acquired its current borders in the 1980 election.

Members
The constituency has been held continuously by the Christian Democratic Union (CDU) since its creation. It was first represented by Manfred Abelein from 1965 to 1990, a total of seven consecutive terms. Georg Brunnhuber was representative from 1990 to 2009. Roderich Kiesewetter was elected in 2009, and re-elected in 2013, 2017, and 2021.

Election results

2021 election

2017 election

2013 election

2009 election

References

Federal electoral districts in Baden-Württemberg
1965 establishments in West Germany
Constituencies established in 1965
Heidenheim (district)
Ostalbkreis